Anastasia Konstantinovna Bryzgalova (born 13 December 1992) is a Russian curler. She currently coaches the Alina Kovaleva rink from Saint Petersburg.

Career
She and Alexander Krushelnitskiy won the 2016 World Mixed Doubles Curling Championship in Karlstad, Sweden. She plays professionally for CC Adamant (St. Petersburg).

Her 2018 Olympic bronze medal was rescinded, after her partner Krushelnitskiy tested positive for meldonium at the Games.

Personal life
Bryzgalova is a student at the St. Petersburg Specialized School of Olympic Reserve #2 (a technical school). Since 2016, she has also studied at the Lesgaft National State University of Physical Education, Sport and Health. She is married to her doubles partner, Alexander Krushelnitskiy.

Awards
 Merited Master of Sports of Russia
 World Mixed Doubles Curling Championship: Gold (2016)

References

External links

Living people
1992 births
Russian female curlers
Curlers from Saint Petersburg
World mixed doubles curling champions
Russian curling champions
Curlers at the 2018 Winter Olympics
Olympic curlers of Russia
Competitors stripped of Winter Olympics medals
World mixed curling champions